Sus is a  commune in the Pyrénées-Atlantiques department and Nouvelle-Aquitaine region of south-western France. The town is located near Susmiou, Gurs and Navarrenx. The population was 377 as of 2019.

Geography

Sus is in the Oloron-Sainte-Marie arrondissement in the southern part of Nouvelle-Aquitaine. Sus is 1.4 km (0.9 mi) from Susmiou, 1.8 km (1.1 mi) from Navarrenx, 2.5 km (1.6 mi) from Gurs, 13.2 km (8.2 mi) from Mourenx, 32.1 km (19.9 mi) from Pau, and 60.8 km (37.8 mi) from Bayonne. It sits west of the Gave d'Oloron river. On the opposite side of the river is Jasses.

See also
Communes of the Pyrénées-Atlantiques department

References

Communes of Pyrénées-Atlantiques